Winant Van Winkle (1879–1943), born and raised in Rutherford, was a Republican who represented Bergen County, New Jersey in the New Jersey Senate from 1935 to 1940. He was the eight generation of his family in Bergen County.

References

1879 births
1943 deaths
People from Rutherford, New Jersey
Politicians from Bergen County, New Jersey
Republican Party New Jersey state senators
American people of Dutch descent
20th-century American politicians